Guanaqueros Bay is a bay in Chile's Coquimbo Region. The bay is U-shaped, open to the northwest. Its western boundary is made up by Punta Guanaquero, a spur of Cerro Guanaqueros. The beach of Guanaros Bay lies about 34 km south of the port city of Coquimbo. The area around the bay has a cold desert climate.

References

se:Bahía Guanaquero
Bays of Chile
Bodies of water of Coquimbo Region
Coasts of Coquimbo Region